USS Henry County may refer to:

, was commissioned in May 1930 and decommissioned August 1930 and then loaned to the State of California
, was a landing ship tank commissioned as LST-824 in November 1944, renamed Henry County in July 1955 and transferred to Malaysia in April 1975

United States Navy ship names